

Africa

President – Abdelaziz Bouteflika, President of Algeria (1999–2019)
Prime Minister – Ali Benflis, Prime Minister of Algeria (2000–2003)

President – José Eduardo dos Santos, President of Angola (1979–2017)
Prime Minister – Fernando da Piedade Dias dos Santos, Prime Minister of Angola (2002–2008)

President – Mathieu Kérékou, President of Benin (1996–2006)

President – Festus Mogae, President of Botswana (1998–2008)

President – Blaise Compaoré, President of Burkina Faso (1987–2014)
Prime Minister – Paramanga Ernest Yonli, Prime Minister of Burkina Faso (2000–2007)

President – Pierre Buyoya, President of Burundi (1996–2003)

President – Paul Biya, President of Cameroon (1982–present)
Prime Minister – Peter Mafany Musonge, Prime Minister of Cameroon (1996–2004)

President – Pedro Pires, President of Cape Verde (2001–2011)
Prime Minister – José Maria Neves, Prime Minister of Cape Verde (2001–2016)

President – Ange-Félix Patassé, President of the Central African Republic (1993–2003)
Prime Minister – Martin Ziguélé, Prime Minister of the Central African Republic (2001–2003)

President – Idriss Déby, President of Chad (1990–2021)
Prime Minister –
Nagoum Yamassoum, Prime Minister of Chad (1999–2002)
Haroun Kabadi, Prime Minister of Chad (2002–2003)

President –
Azali Assoumani, President of the Comoros (1999–2002)
Hamada Madi, President of the Comoros (2002)
Azali Assoumani, President of the Comoros (2002–2006)
Prime Minister – Hamada Madi, Prime Minister of the Comoros (2000–2002)
 (unrecognised, secessionist state)
rejoined the Comoros on 10 March
President – Mohamed Bacar, President of Anjouan (2001–2007)

President – Denis Sassou Nguesso, President of the Republic of the Congo (1997–present)

President – Joseph Kabila, President of the Democratic Republic of the Congo (2001–2019)

President – Ismaïl Omar Guelleh, President of Djibouti (1999–present)
Prime Minister – Dileita Mohamed Dileita, Prime Minister of Djibouti (2001–2013)

President – Hosni Mubarak, President of Egypt (1981–2011)
Prime Minister – Atef Ebeid, Prime Minister of Egypt (1999–2004)

President – Teodoro Obiang Nguema Mbasogo, President of Equatorial Guinea (1979–present)
Prime Minister – Cándido Muatetema Rivas, Prime Minister of Equatorial Guinea (2001–2004)

President – Isaias Afwerki, President of Eritrea (1991–present)

President – Girma Wolde-Giorgis, President of Ethiopia (2001–2013)
Prime Minister – Meles Zenawi, Prime Minister of Ethiopia (1995–2012)

President – Omar Bongo, President of Gabon (1967–2009)
Prime Minister – Jean-François Ntoutoume Emane, Prime Minister of Gabon (1999–2006)

President – Yahya Jammeh, President of the Gambia (1994–2017)

President – John Kufuor, President of Ghana (2001–2009)

President – Lansana Conté, President of Guinea (1984–2008)
Prime Minister – Lamine Sidimé, Prime Minister of Guinea (1999–2004)

President – Kumba Ialá, President of Guinea-Bissau (2000–2003)
Prime Minister –
Alamara Nhassé, Prime Minister of Guinea-Bissau (2001–2002)
Mário Pires, Prime Minister of Guinea-Bissau (2002–2003)

President – Laurent Gbagbo, President of the Ivory Coast (2000–2011)
Prime Minister – Pascal Affi N'Guessan, Prime Minister of the Ivory Coast (2000–2003)

President –
Daniel arap Moi, President of Kenya (1978–2002)
Mwai Kibaki, President of Kenya (2002–2013)

Monarch – Letsie III, King of Lesotho (1996–present)
Prime Minister – Pakalitha Mosisili, Prime Minister of Lesotho (1998–2012)

President – Charles Taylor, President of Liberia (2000–2003)

De facto Head of State – Muammar Gaddafi, Guide of the Revolution of Libya (1969–2011)
De jure Head of State – Muhammad az-Zanati, General Secretary of the General People's Congress of Libya (1992–2008)
Prime Minister – Imbarek Shamekh, General Secretary of the General People's Committee of Libya (2000–2003)

President –
Didier Ratsiraka, President of Madagascar (1997–2002)
Marc Ravalomanana, President of Madagascar (2002–2009)
Prime Minister –
Tantely Andrianarivo, Prime Minister of Madagascar (1998–2002)
Jacques Sylla, Prime Minister of Madagascar (2002–2007)

President – Bakili Muluzi, President of Malawi (1994–2004)

President –
Alpha Oumar Konaré, President of Mali (1992–2002)
Amadou Toumani Touré, President of Mali (2002–2012)
Prime Minister –
Mandé Sidibé, Prime Minister of Mali (2000–2002)
Modibo Keita, Prime Minister of Mali (2002)
Ahmed Mohamed ag Hamani, Prime Minister of Mali (2002–2004)

President – Maaouya Ould Sid'Ahmed Taya, President of Mauritania (1984–2005)
Prime Minister – Cheikh El Avia Ould Mohamed Khouna, Prime Minister of Mauritania (1998–2003)

President –
Cassam Uteem, President of Mauritius (1992–2002)
Angidi Chettiar, Acting President of Mauritius (2002)
Ariranga Pillay, Acting President of Mauritius (2002)
Karl Offmann, President of Mauritius (2002–2003)
Prime Minister – Sir Anerood Jugnauth, Prime Minister of Mauritius (2000–2003)
  (departmental collectivity of France)
Prefect –
Philippe de Mester, Prefect of Mayotte (2001–2002)
Jean-Jacques Brot, Prefect of Mayotte (2002–2005)
Head of Government – Younoussa Bamana, President of the General Council of Mayotte (1991–2004)

Monarch – Mohammed VI, King of Morocco (1999–present)
Prime Minister –
Abderrahmane Youssoufi, Prime Minister of Morocco (1998–2002)
Driss Jettou, Prime Minister of Morocco (2002–2007)
 (self-declared, partially recognised state)
President – Mohamed Abdelaziz, President of Western Sahara (1976–2016)
Prime Minister – Bouchraya Hammoudi Bayoun, Prime Minister of Western Sahara (1999–2003)

President – Joaquim Chissano, President of Mozambique (1986–2005)
Prime Minister – Pascoal Mocumbi, Prime Minister of Mozambique (1994–2004)

President – Sam Nujoma, President of Namibia (1990–2005)
Prime Minister –
Hage Geingob, Prime Minister of Namibia (1990–2002)
Theo-Ben Gurirab, Prime Minister of Namibia (2002–2005)

President – Mamadou Tandja, President of Niger (1999–2010)
Prime Minister – Hama Amadou, Prime Minister of Niger (2000–2007)

President – Olusegun Obasanjo, President of Nigeria (1999–2007)

President – Paul Kagame, President of Rwanda (2000–present)
Prime Minister – Bernard Makuza, Prime Minister of Rwanda (2000–2011)
 (Overseas Territory of the United Kingdom)
redesignated from dependent territory to overseas territory on 21 May
Governor – David Hollamby, Governor of Saint Helena (1999–2004)

President – Fradique de Menezes, President of São Tomé and Príncipe (2001–2003)
Prime Minister –
Evaristo Carvalho, Prime Minister of São Tomé and Príncipe (2001–2002)
Gabriel Costa, Prime Minister of São Tomé and Príncipe (2002)
Maria das Neves, Prime Minister of São Tomé and Príncipe (2002–2004)

President – Abdoulaye Wade, President of Senegal (2000–2012)
Prime Minister –
Mame Madior Boye, Prime Minister of Senegal (2001–2002)
Idrissa Seck, Prime Minister of Senegal (2002–2004)

President – France-Albert René, President of Seychelles (1977–2004)

President – Ahmad Tejan Kabbah, President of Sierra Leone (1998–2007)

President – Abdiqasim Salad Hassan, President of Somalia (2000–2004)
Prime Minister – Hassan Abshir Farah, Prime Minister of Somalia (2001–2003)
 (unrecognised, secessionist state)
President –
Muhammad Haji Ibrahim Egal, President of Somaliland (1993–2002)
Dahir Riyale Kahin, President of Somaliland (2002–2010)
 (self-declared autonomous state)
President –
Jama Ali Jama, President of Puntland (2001–2002)
Abdullahi Yusuf Ahmed, President of Puntland (2002–2004)

President – Thabo Mbeki, President of South Africa (1999–2008)

President – Omar al-Bashir, President of Sudan (1989–2019)

Monarch – Mswati III, King of Swaziland (1986–present)
Prime Minister – Barnabas Sibusiso Dlamini, Prime Minister of Swaziland (1996–2003)

President – Benjamin Mkapa, President of Tanzania (1995–2005)
Prime Minister – Frederick Sumaye, Prime Minister of Tanzania (1995–2005)

President – Gnassingbé Eyadéma, President of Togo (1967–2005)
Prime Minister –
Agbéyomé Kodjo, Prime Minister of Togo (2000–2002)
Koffi Sama, Prime Minister of Togo (2002–2005)

President – Zine El Abidine Ben Ali, President of Tunisia (1987–2011)
Prime Minister – Mohamed Ghannouchi, Prime Minister of Tunisia (1999–2011)

President – Yoweri Museveni, President of Uganda (1986–present)
Prime Minister – Apolo Nsibambi, Prime Minister of Uganda (1999–2011)

President –
Frederick Chiluba, President of Zambia (1991–2002)
Levy Mwanawasa, President of Zambia (2002–2008)

President – Robert Mugabe, President of Zimbabwe (1987–2017)

Asia

President – Hamid Karzai, Chairman of the Afghan Interim Administration (2001–2002); President of Afghanistan (2002–2014)
 
the State was superseded on 14 February
Monarch – Sheikh Hamad bin Isa Al Khalifa, King of Bahrain (1999–present)
Prime Minister – Sheikh Khalifa bin Salman Al Khalifa, Prime Minister of Bahrain (1970–2020)

President –
A. Q. M. Badruddoza Chowdhury, President of Bangladesh (2001–2002)
Muhammad Jamiruddin Sircar, Acting President of Bangladesh (2002)
Iajuddin Ahmed, President of Bangladesh (2002–2009)
Prime Minister – Khaleda Zia, Prime Minister of Bangladesh (2001–2006)

Monarch – Jigme Singye Wangchuck, King of Bhutan (1972–2006)
Prime Minister –
Khandu Wangchuk, Prime Minister of Bhutan (2001–2002)
Kinzang Dorji, Prime Minister of Bhutan (2002–2003)

Monarch – Hassanal Bolkiah, Sultan of Brunei (1967–present)
Prime Minister – Hassanal Bolkiah, Prime Minister of Brunei (1984–present)

Monarch – Norodom Sihanouk, King of Cambodia (1993–2004)
Prime Minister – Hun Sen, Prime Minister of Cambodia (1985–present)

Communist Party Leader –
Jiang Zemin, General Secretary of the Chinese Communist Party (1989–2002)
Hu Jintao, General Secretary of the Chinese Communist Party (2002–2012)
President – Jiang Zemin, President of China (1993–2003)
Premier – Zhu Rongji, Premier of the State Council of China (1998–2003)
 
gained independence; the UN Transitional Administration dissolved on 20 May
President – Xanana Gusmão, President of East Timor (2002–2007)
Prime Minister – Mari Alkatiri, Prime Minister of East Timor (2001–2006)
UN Special Representative – Sérgio Vieira de Mello, Special Representative of the UN Secretary-General for East Timor (1999–2002)

President –
K. R. Narayanan, President of India (1997–2002)
A. P. J. Abdul Kalam, President of India (2002–2007)
Prime Minister – Atal Bihari Vajpayee, Prime Minister of India (1998–2004)

President – Megawati Sukarnoputri, President of Indonesia (2001–2004)

Supreme Leader – Ayatollah Ali Khamenei, Supreme Leader of Iran (1989–present)
President – Mohammad Khatami, President of Iran (1997–2005)

President – Saddam Hussein, President of Iraq (1979–2003)
Prime Minister – Saddam Hussein, Prime Minister of Iraq (1994–2003)

President – Moshe Katsav, President of Israel (2000–2007)
Prime Minister – Ariel Sharon, Prime Minister of Israel (2001–2006)
 (non-state administrative authority)
President – Yasser Arafat, President of the Palestinian National Authority (1994–2004)

Monarch – Akihito, Emperor of Japan (1989–2019)
Prime Minister – Junichirō Koizumi, Prime Minister of Japan (2001–2006)

Monarch – Abdullah II, King of Jordan (1999–present)
Prime Minister – Ali Abu al-Ragheb, Prime Minister of Jordan (2000–2003)

President – Nursultan Nazarbayev, President of Kazakhstan (1990–2019)
Prime Minister –
Kassym-Jomart Tokayev, Prime Minister of Kazakhstan (1999–2002)
Imangali Tasmagambetov, Prime Minister of Kazakhstan (2002–2003)

Communist Party Leader – Kim Jong-il, General Secretary of the Workers' Party of Korea (1997–2011)
De facto Head of State – Kim Jong-il, Chairman of the National Defence Commission of North Korea (1993–2011)
De jure Head of State – Kim Yong-nam, Chairman of the Presidium of the Supreme People's Assembly of North Korea (1998–2019)
Premier – Hong Song-nam, Premier of the Cabinet of North Korea (1997–2003)

President – Kim Dae-jung, President of South Korea (1998–2003)
Prime Minister –
Lee Han-dong, Prime Minister of South Korea (2000–2002)
Chang Sang, Acting Prime Minister of South Korea (2002)
Jeon Yun Churl, Acting Prime Minister of South Korea (2002)
Chang Dae-hwan, Acting Prime Minister of South Korea (2002)
Kim Suk-soo, Prime Minister of South Korea (2002–2003)

Monarch – Sheikh Jaber Al-Ahmad Al-Sabah, Emir of Kuwait (1977–2006)
Prime Minister – Sheikh Saad Al-Salim Al-Sabah, Prime Minister of Kuwait (1978–2003)

President – Askar Akayev, President of Kyrgyzstan (1990–2005)
Prime Minister –
Kurmanbek Bakiyev, Prime Minister of Kyrgyzstan (2000–2002)
Nikolai Tanayev, Prime Minister of Kyrgyzstan (2002–2005)

Communist Party Leader – Khamtai Siphandon, General Secretary of the Lao People's Revolutionary Party (1992–2006)
President – Khamtai Siphandon, President of Laos (1998–2006)
Premier – Bounnhang Vorachith, Chairman of the Council of Ministers of Laos (2001–2006)

President – Émile Lahoud, President of Lebanon (1998–2007)
Prime Minister – Rafic Hariri, President of the Council of Ministers of Lebanon (2000–2004)

Monarch – Tuanku Syed Sirajuddin, Yang di-Pertuan Agong of Malaysia (2001–2006)
Prime Minister – Mahathir Mohamad, Prime Minister of Malaysia (1981–2003)

President – Maumoon Abdul Gayoom, President of the Maldives (1978–2008)

President – Natsagiin Bagabandi, President of Mongolia (1997–2005)
Prime Minister – Nambaryn Enkhbayar, Prime Minister of Mongolia (2000–2004)

Head of State – Than Shwe, Chairman of the State Peace and Development Council of Myanmar (1992–2011)
Prime Minister – Than Shwe, Prime Minister of Myanmar (1992–2003)

Monarch – Gyanendra, King of Nepal (2001–2008)
Prime Minister –
Sher Bahadur Deuba, Prime Minister of Nepal (2001–2002)
Gyanendra, Prime Minister of Nepal (2002)
Lokendra Bahadur Chand, Prime Minister of Nepal (2002–2003)

Monarch – Qaboos bin Said al Said, Sultan of Oman (1970–present)
Prime Minister – Qaboos bin Said al Said, Prime Minister of Oman (1972–present)

President – Pervez Musharraf, President of Pakistan (2001–2008)
Prime Minister –
Pervez Musharraf, Chief Executive of Pakistan (1999–2002)
Zafarullah Khan Jamali, Prime Minister of Pakistan (2002–2004)

President – Gloria Macapagal Arroyo, President of the Philippines (2001–2010)

Monarch – Sheikh Hamad bin Khalifa Al Thani, Emir of Qatar (1995–2013)
Prime Minister – Sheikh Abdullah bin Khalifa Al Thani, Prime Minister of Qatar (1996–2007)

Monarch – Fahd, King of Saudi Arabia (1982–2005)
Regent – Crown Prince Abdullah, Regent of Saudi Arabia (1996–2005)
Prime Minister – Fahd, Prime Minister of Saudi Arabia (1982–2005)

President – S. R. Nathan, President of Singapore (1999–2011)
Prime Minister – Goh Chok Tong, Prime Minister of Singapore (1990–2004)

President – Chandrika Kumaratunga, President of Sri Lanka (1994–2005)
Prime Minister – Ranil Wickremesinghe, Prime Minister of Sri Lanka (2001–2004)

President – Bashar al-Assad, President of Syria (2000–present)
Prime Minister – Muhammad Mustafa Mero, Prime Minister of Syria (2000–2003)

President – Chen Shui-bian, President of Taiwan (2000–2008)
Premier –
Chang Chun-hsiung, President of the Executive Yuan of Taiwan (2000–2002)
Yu Shyi-kun, President of the Executive Yuan of Taiwan (2002–2005)

President – Emomali Rahmonov, President of Tajikistan (1992–present)
Prime Minister – Oqil Oqilov, Prime Minister of Tajikistan (1999–2013)

Monarch – Bhumibol Adulyadej, King of Thailand (1946–2016)
Prime Minister – Thaksin Shinawatra, Prime Minister of Thailand (2001–2006)

President – Ahmet Necdet Sezer, President of Turkey (2000–2007)
Prime Minister –
Bülent Ecevit, Prime Minister of Turkey (1999–2002)
Abdullah Gül, Prime Minister of Turkey (2002–2003)

President – Saparmurat Niyazov, President of Turkmenistan (1990–2006)

President – Sheikh Zayed bin Sultan Al Nahyan, President of the United Arab Emirates (1976–2004)
Prime Minister – Sheikh Maktoum bin Rashid Al Maktoum, Prime Minister of the United Arab Emirates (1990–2006)

President – Islam Karimov, President of Uzbekistan (1990–2016)
Prime Minister – Oʻtkir Sultonov, Prime Minister of Uzbekistan (1995–2003)

Communist Party Leader – Nông Đức Mạnh, General Secretary of the Communist Party of Vietnam (2001–2011)
President – Trần Đức Lương, President of Vietnam (1997–2006)
Prime Minister – Phan Văn Khải, Prime Minister of Vietnam (1997–2006)

President – Ali Abdullah Saleh, President of Yemen (1978–2012)
Prime Minister – Abdul Qadir Bajamal, Prime Minister of Yemen (2001–2007)

Europe

President –
Rexhep Meidani, President of Albania (1997–2002)
Alfred Moisiu, President of Albania (2002–2007)
Prime Minister –
Ilir Meta, Prime Minister of Albania (1999–2002)
Pandeli Majko, Prime Minister of Albania (2002)
Fatos Nano, Prime Minister of Albania (2002–2005)
°
Monarchs –
French Co-Prince – Jacques Chirac, French Co-prince of Andorra (1995–2007)
Co-Prince's Representative –
Frédéric de Saint-Sernin (1999–2002)
Philippe Massoni (2002–2007)
Episcopal Co-Prince – Archbishop Joan Martí i Alanis, Episcopal Co-prince of Andorra (1971–2003)
Co-Prince's Representative – Nemesi Marqués Oste (1993–2012)
Prime Minister – Marc Forné Molné, Head of Government of Andorra (1994–2005)

President – Robert Kocharyan, President of Armenia (1998–2008)
Prime Minister – Andranik Margaryan, Prime Minister of Armenia (2000–2007)

President – Thomas Klestil, Federal President of Austria (1992–2004)
Chancellor – Wolfgang Schüssel, Federal Chancellor of Austria (2000–2007)

President – Heydar Aliyev, President of Azerbaijan (1993–2003)
Prime Minister – Artur Rasizade, Prime Minister of Azerbaijan (1996–2003)
 (unrecognised, secessionist state)
President – Arkadi Ghukasyan, President of Nagorno-Karabakh (1997–2007)
Prime Minister – Anushavan Danielyan, Prime Minister of Nagorno-Karabakh (1999–2007)

President – Alexander Lukashenko, President of Belarus (1994–present)
Prime Minister – Gennady Novitsky, Prime Minister of Belarus (2001–2004)

Monarch – Albert II, King of the Belgians (1993–2013)
Prime Minister – Guy Verhofstadt, Prime Minister of Belgium (1999–2008)

Head of State – Presidency of Bosnia and Herzegovina
Serb Member –
Živko Radišić (1998–2002)
Mirko Šarović (2002–2003; Chairman of the Presidency of Bosnia and Herzegovina, 2002–2003)
Bosniak Member –
Beriz Belkić (2001–2002; Chairman of the Presidency of Bosnia and Herzegovina, 2002)
Sulejman Tihić (2002–2006)
Croat Member –
Jozo Križanović (2001–2002; Chairman of the Presidency of Bosnia and Herzegovina, 2001–2002)
Dragan Čović (2002–2005)
Prime Minister –
Zlatko Lagumdžija, Chairman of the Council of Ministers of Bosnia and Herzegovina (2001–2002)
Dragan Mikerević, Chairman of the Council of Ministers of Bosnia and Herzegovina (2002)
Adnan Terzić, Chairman of the Council of Ministers of Bosnia and Herzegovina (2002–2007)
High Representative –
Wolfgang Petritsch, High Representative for Bosnia and Herzegovina (1999–2002)
Lord  (Paddy) Ashdown, High Representative for Bosnia and Herzegovina (2002–2006)

President –
Petar Stoyanov, President of Bulgaria (1997–2002)
Georgi Parvanov, President of Bulgaria (2002–2012)
Prime Minister – Simeon Saxe-Coburg-Gotha, Prime Minister of Bulgaria (2001–2005)

President – Stjepan Mesić, President of Croatia (2000–2010)
Prime Minister – Ivica Račan, Prime Minister of Croatia (2000–2003)

President – Glafcos Clerides, President of Cyprus (1993–2003)
 (unrecognised, secessionist state)
President – Rauf Denktaş, President of Northern Cyprus (1976–2005)
Prime Minister – Derviş Eroğlu, Prime Minister of Northern Cyprus (1996–2004)

President – Václav Havel, President of the Czech Republic (1993–2003)
Prime Minister –
Miloš Zeman, Prime Minister of the Czech Republic (1998–2002)
Vladimír Špidla, Prime Minister of the Czech Republic (2002–2004)

Monarch – Margrethe II, Queen of Denmark (1972–present)
Prime Minister – Anders Fogh Rasmussen, Prime Minister of Denmark (2001–2009)

President – Arnold Rüütel, President of Estonia (2001–2006)
Prime Minister –
Mart Laar, Prime Minister of Estonia (1999–2002)
Siim Kallas, Prime Minister of Estonia (2002–2003)

President – Tarja Halonen, President of Finland (2000–2012)
Prime Minister – Paavo Lipponen, Prime Minister of Finland (1995–2003)

President – Jacques Chirac, President of France (1995–2007)
Prime Minister –
Lionel Jospin, Prime Minister of France (1997–2002)
Jean-Pierre Raffarin, Prime Minister of France (2002–2005)

President – Eduard Shevardnadze, President of Georgia (1995–2004)
Prime Minister – Avtandil Jorbenadze, Minister of State of Georgia (2001–2004)
 (unrecognised, secessionist state)
President – Vladislav Ardzinba, President of Abkhazia (1990–2005)
Prime Minister –
Anri Jergenia, Prime Minister of Abkhazia (2001–2002)
Gennadi Gagulia, Prime Minister of Abkhazia (2002–2003)
 (unrecognised, secessionist state)
President – Eduard Kokoity, President of South Ossetia (2001–2011)
Prime Minister – Gerasim Khugayev, Prime Minister of South Ossetia (2001–2003)

President – Johannes Rau, Federal President of Germany (1999–2004)
Chancellor – Gerhard Schröder, Federal Chancellor of Germany (1998–2005)

President – Konstantinos Stephanopoulos, President of Greece (1995–2005)
Prime Minister – Costas Simitis, Prime Minister of Greece (1996–2004)

President – Ferenc Mádl, President of Hungary (2000–2005)
Prime Minister –
Viktor Orbán, Prime Minister of Hungary (1998–2002)
Péter Medgyessy, Prime Minister of Hungary (2002–2004)

President – Ólafur Ragnar Grímsson, President of Iceland (1996–2016)
Prime Minister – Davíð Oddsson, Prime Minister of Iceland (1991–2004)

President – Mary McAleese, President of Ireland (1997–2011)
Prime Minister – Bertie Ahern, Taoiseach of Ireland (1997–2008)

President – Carlo Azeglio Ciampi, President of Italy (1999–2006)
Prime Minister – Silvio Berlusconi, President of the Council of Ministers of Italy (2001–2006)

President – Vaira Vīķe-Freiberga, President of Latvia (1999–2007)
Prime Minister –
Andris Bērziņš, Prime Minister of Latvia (2000–2002)
Einars Repše, Prime Minister of Latvia (2002–2004)

Monarch – Hans-Adam II, Prince Regnant of Liechtenstein (1989–present)
Prime Minister – Otmar Hasler, Head of Government of Liechtenstein (2001–2009)

President – Valdas Adamkus, President of Lithuania (1998–2003)
Prime Minister – Algirdas Brazauskas, Prime Minister of Lithuania (2001–2006)

Monarch – Henri, Grand Duke of Luxembourg (2000–present)
Prime Minister – Jean-Claude Juncker, Prime Minister of Luxembourg (1995–2013)

President – Boris Trajkovski, President of Macedonia (1999–2004)
Prime Minister –
Ljubčo Georgievski, President of the Government of Macedonia (1998–2002)
Branko Crvenkovski, President of the Government of Macedonia (2002–2004)

President – Guido de Marco, President of Malta (1999–2004)
Prime Minister – Eddie Fenech Adami, Prime Minister of Malta (1998–2004)

President – Vladimir Voronin, President of Moldova (2001–2009)
Prime Minister – Vasile Tarlev, Prime Minister of Moldova (2001–2008)
 (unrecognised, secessionist state)
President – Igor Smirnov, President of Transnistria (1990–2011)

Monarch – Rainier III, Sovereign Prince of Monaco (1949–2005)
Prime Minister – Patrick Leclercq, Minister of State of Monaco (2000–2005)

Monarch – Beatrix, Queen of the Netherlands (1980–2013)
 (constituent country of the Kingdom of the Netherlands)
Prime Minister –
Wim Kok, Prime Minister of the Netherlands (1994–2002)
Jan Peter Balkenende, Prime Minister of the Netherlands (2002–2010)
 (constituent country of the Kingdom of the Netherlands)
see 
 (constituent country of the Kingdom of the Netherlands)
see 

Monarch – Harald V, King of Norway (1991–present)
Prime Minister – Kjell Magne Bondevik, Prime Minister of Norway (2001–2005)

President – Aleksander Kwaśniewski, President of Poland (1995–2005)
Prime Minister – Leszek Miller, Chairman of the Council of Ministers of Poland (2001–2004)

President – Jorge Sampaio, President of Portugal (1996–2006)
Prime Minister –
António Guterres, Prime Minister of Portugal (1995–2002)
José Manuel Barroso, Prime Minister of Portugal (2002–2004)

President – Ion Iliescu, President of Romania (2000–2004)
Prime Minister – Adrian Năstase, Prime Minister of Romania (2000–2004)

President – Vladimir Putin, President of Russia (1999–2008)
Prime Minister – Mikhail Kasyanov, Chairman of the Government of Russia (2000–2004)

Captains-Regent –
Alberto Cecchetti and Gino Giovagnoli, Captains Regent of San Marino (2001–2002)
Antonio Lazzaro Volpinari and Giovanni Francesco Ugolini, Captains Regent of San Marino (2002)
Giuseppe Maria Morganti and Mauro Chiaruzzi, Captains Regent of San Marino (2002–2003)

President – Rudolf Schuster, President of Slovakia (1999–2004)
Prime Minister – Mikuláš Dzurinda, Prime Minister of Slovakia (1998–2006)

President –
Milan Kučan, President of Slovenia (1990–2002)
Janez Drnovšek, President of Slovenia (2002–2007)
Prime Minister –
Janez Drnovšek, Prime Minister of Slovenia (2000–2002)
Anton Rop, Prime Minister of Slovenia (2002–2004)

Monarch – Juan Carlos I, King of Spain (1975–2014)
Prime Minister – José María Aznar, President of the Government of Spain (1996–2004)

Monarch – Carl XVI Gustaf, King of Sweden (1973–present)
Prime Minister – Göran Persson, Prime Minister of Sweden (1996–2006)

Council – Federal Council of Switzerland
Members – Kaspar Villiger (1989–2003; President of Switzerland, 2002), Ruth Dreifuss (1993–2002), Moritz Leuenberger (1995–2010), Pascal Couchepin (1998–2009), Ruth Metzler (1999–2003), Joseph Deiss (1999–2006), Samuel Schmid (2000–2008), and Micheline Calmy-Rey (2002–2011)

President – Leonid Kuchma, President of Ukraine (1994–2005)
Prime Minister –
Anatoliy Kinakh, Prime Minister of Ukraine (2001–2002)
Viktor Yanukovych, Prime Minister of Ukraine (2002–2005)

Monarch – Elizabeth II, Queen of the United Kingdom (1952–present)
Prime Minister – Tony Blair, Prime Minister of the United Kingdom (1997–2007)
 (Crown dependency of the United Kingdom)
Lieutenant-Governor – Ian Macfadyen, Lieutenant Governor of the Isle of Man (2000–2005)
Chief Minister – Richard Corkill, Chief Minister of the Isle of Man (2001–2004)
 (Crown dependency of the United Kingdom)
Lieutenant-Governor – Sir John Foley, Lieutenant Governor of Guernsey (2000–2005)
Bailiff – Sir de Vic Carey, Bailiff of Guernsey (1999–2005)
 (Crown dependency of the United Kingdom)
Lieutenant-Governor – Sir John Cheshire, Lieutenant Governor of Jersey (2001–2006)
Bailiff – Sir Philip Bailhache, Bailiff of Jersey (1995–2009)
 (Overseas Territory of the United Kingdom)
redesignated from a Dependent Territory of the United Kingdom of Great Britain and Northern Ireland on 21 May
Governor – David Durie, Governor of Gibraltar (2000–2003)
Chief Minister – Peter Caruana, Chief Minister of Gibraltar (1996–2011)

Monarch – Pope John Paul II, Sovereign of Vatican City (1978–2005)
Head of Government – Cardinal Edmund Szoka, President of the Governorate of Vatican City (1997–2006)
Holy See (sui generis subject of public international law)
Secretary of State – Cardinal Angelo Sodano, Cardinal Secretary of State (1990–2006)

President – Vojislav Koštunica, President of Yugoslavia
Prime Minister – Dragiša Pešić, Prime Minister of Yugoslavia (2001–2003)
Kosovo (Self-Governing Entity under UN administration)
President – Ibrahim Rugova, President of Kosovo (2002–2006)
Prime Minister – Bajram Rexhepi, Prime Minister of Kosovo (2002–2004)
UN Special Representative –
Charles H. Brayshaw, Acting Special Representative of the UN Secretary-General for Kosovo (2002)
Michael Steiner, Special Representative of the UN Secretary-General for Kosovo (2002–2003)

North America
 (Overseas Territory of the United Kingdom)
redesignated from a Dependent Territory of the United Kingdom of Great Britain and Northern Ireland on 21 May
Governor – Peter Johnstone, Governor of Anguilla (2000–2004)
Chief Minister – Osbourne Fleming, Chief Minister of Anguilla (2000–2010)

Monarch – Elizabeth II, Queen of Antigua and Barbuda (1981–present)
Governor-General – Sir James Carlisle, Governor-General of Antigua and Barbuda (1993–2007)
Prime Minister – Lester Bird, Prime Minister of Antigua and Barbuda (1994–2004)
 (constituent country of the Kingdom of the Netherlands)
Governor – Olindo Koolman, Governor of Aruba (1992–2004)
Prime Minister – Nelson Oduber, Prime Minister of Aruba (2001–2009)

Monarch – Elizabeth II, Queen of the Bahamas (1973–present)
Governor-General – Dame Ivy Dumont, Governor-General of the Bahamas (2001–2005)
Prime Minister –
Hubert Ingraham, Prime Minister of the Bahamas (1992–2002)
Perry Christie, Prime Minister of the Bahamas (2002–2007)

Monarch – Elizabeth II, Queen of Barbados (1966–2021)
Governor-General – Sir Clifford Husbands, Governor-General of Barbados (1996–2011)
Prime Minister – Owen Arthur, Prime Minister of Barbados (1994–2008)

Monarch – Elizabeth II, Queen of Belize (1981–present)
Governor-General – Sir Colville Young, Governor-General of Belize (1993–2021)
Prime Minister – Said Musa, Prime Minister of Belize (1998–2008)
 (Overseas Territory of the United Kingdom)
redesignated from a Dependent Territory of the United Kingdom of Great Britain and Northern Ireland on 21 May
Governor –
Tim Gurney, Acting Governor of Bermuda (2001–2002)
Sir John Vereker, Governor of Bermuda (2002–2007)
Premier – Jennifer M. Smith, Premier of Bermuda (1998–2003)
 (Overseas Territory of the United Kingdom)
redesignated from a Dependent Territory of the United Kingdom of Great Britain and Northern Ireland on 21 May
Governor –
Frank Savage, Governor of the British Virgin Islands (1998–2002)
Elton Georges, Acting Governor of the British Virgin Islands (2002)
Tom Macan, Governor of the British Virgin Islands (2002–2006)
Chief Minister – Ralph T. O'Neal, Chief Minister of the British Virgin Islands (1995–2003)

Monarch – Elizabeth II, Queen of Canada (1952–present)
Governor-General – Adrienne Clarkson, Governor General of Canada (1999–2005)
Prime Minister – Jean Chrétien, Prime Minister of Canada (1993–2003)
 (Overseas Territory of the United Kingdom)
redesignated from a Dependent Territory of the United Kingdom of Great Britain and Northern Ireland on 21 May
Governor –
Peter Smith, Governor of the Cayman Islands (1999–2002)
James Ryan, Acting Governor of the Cayman Islands (2002)
Bruce Dinwiddy, Governor of the Cayman Islands (2002–2005)
Head of Government – McKeeva Bush, Leader of Government Business of the Cayman Islands (2001–2005)

President –
Miguel Ángel Rodríguez, President of Costa Rica (1998–2002)
Abel Pacheco, President of Costa Rica (2002–2006)

Communist Party Leader – Fidel Castro, First Secretary of the Communist Party of Cuba (1965–2011)
President – Fidel Castro, President of the Council of State of Cuba (1976–2008)
Prime Minister – Fidel Castro, President of the Council of Ministers of Cuba (1959–2008)

President – Vernon Shaw, President of Dominica (1998–2004)
Prime Minister – Pierre Charles, Prime Minister of Dominica (2000–2004)

President – Hipólito Mejía, President of the Dominican Republic (2000–2004)

President – Francisco Flores Pérez, President of El Salvador (1999–2004)

Monarch – Elizabeth II, Queen of Grenada (1974–present)
Governor-General – Sir Daniel Williams, Governor-General of Grenada (1996–2008)
Prime Minister – Keith Mitchell, Prime Minister of Grenada (1995–2008)

President – Alfonso Portillo, President of Guatemala (2000–2004)

President – Jean-Bertrand Aristide, President of Haiti (2001–2004)
Prime Minister –
Jean Marie Chérestal, Prime Minister of Haiti (2001–2002)
Yvon Neptune, Prime Minister of Haiti (2002–2004)

President –
Carlos Roberto Flores, President of Honduras (1998–2002)
Ricardo Maduro, President of Honduras (2002–2006)

Monarch – Elizabeth II, Queen of Jamaica (1962–present)
Governor-General – Sir Howard Cooke, Governor-General of Jamaica (1991–2006)
Prime Minister – P. J. Patterson, Prime Minister of Jamaica (1992–2006)

President – Vicente Fox, President of Mexico (2000–2006)
 (Overseas Territory of the United Kingdom)
redesignated from a Dependent Territory of the United Kingdom of Great Britain and Northern Ireland on 21 May
Governor – Tony Longrigg, Governor of Montserrat (2001–2004)
Chief Minister – John Osborne, Chief Minister of Montserrat (2001–2006)
 (constituent country of the Kingdom of the Netherlands)
Governor –
Jaime Saleh, Governor of the Netherlands Antilles (1990–2002)
Frits Goedgedrag, Governor of the Netherlands Antilles (2002–2010)
Prime Minister –
Miguel Arcangel Pourier, Prime Minister of the Netherlands Antilles (1999–2002)
Etienne Ys, Prime Minister of the Netherlands Antilles (2002–2003)

President –
Arnoldo Alemán, President of Nicaragua (1997–2002)
Enrique Bolaños, President of Nicaragua (2002–2007)

President – Mireya Moscoso, President of Panama (1999–2004)

Monarch – Elizabeth II, Queen of Saint Kitts and Nevis (1983–present)
Governor-General – Sir Cuthbert Sebastian, Governor-General of Saint Kitts and Nevis (1996–2013)
Prime Minister – Denzil Douglas, Prime Minister of Saint Kitts and Nevis (1995–2015)
 
Monarch – Elizabeth II, Queen of Saint Lucia (1979–present)
Governor-General – Dame Pearlette Louisy, Governor-General of Saint Lucia (1997–2017)
Prime Minister – Kenny Anthony, Prime Minister of Saint Lucia (1997–2006)
  (departmental collectivity of France)
Prefect –
Jean-François Tallec, Prefect of Saint Pierre and Miquelon (2001–2002)
Claude Valleix, Prefect of Saint Pierre and Miquelon (2002–2005)
Head of Government – Marc Plantegenest, President of the General Council of Saint Pierre and Miquelon (2000–2005)

Monarch – Elizabeth II, Queen of Saint Vincent and the Grenadines (1979–present)
Governor-General –
Sir Charles Antrobus, Governor-General of Saint Vincent and the Grenadines (1996–2002)
Monica Dacon, Acting Governor-General of Saint Vincent and the Grenadines (2002)
Sir Frederick Ballantyne, Governor-General of Saint Vincent and the Grenadines (2002–2019)
Prime Minister – Ralph Gonsalves, Prime Minister of Saint Vincent and the Grenadines (2001–present)

President – A. N. R. Robinson, President of Trinidad and Tobago (1997–2003)
Prime Minister – Patrick Manning, Prime Minister of Trinidad and Tobago (2001–2010)
 (Overseas Territory of the United Kingdom)
redesignated from a Dependent Territory of the United Kingdom of Great Britain and Northern Ireland on 21 May
Governor –
Mervyn Jones, Governor of the Turks and Caicos Islands (2000–2002)
Cynthia Astwood, Acting Governor of the Turks and Caicos Islands (2002)
Jim Poston, Governor of the Turks and Caicos Islands (2002–2005)
Chief Minister – Derek Hugh Taylor, Chief Minister of the Turks and Caicos Islands (1995–2003)

President – George W. Bush, President of the United States (2001–2009)
 (Commonwealth of the United States)
Governor – Sila María Calderón, Governor of Puerto Rico (2001–2005)
 (insular area of the United States)
Governor – Charles Wesley Turnbull, Governor of the United States Virgin Islands (1999–2007)

Oceania
 (unorganised, unincorporated territory of the United States)
Governor – Tauese Sunia, Governor of American Samoa (1997–2003)

Monarch – Elizabeth II, Queen of Australia (1952–present)
Governor-General – Peter Hollingworth, Governor-General of Australia (2001–2003)
Prime Minister – John Howard, Prime Minister of Australia (1996–2007)
 (external territory of Australia)
Administrator – Bill Taylor, Administrator of Christmas Island (1999–2003)
Shire-President – Andrew Smolders, Shire president of Christmas Island (2001–2003)
Cocos (Keeling) Islands (external territory of Australia)
Administrator – Bill Taylor, Administrator of the Cocos (Keeling) Islands (1999–2003)
Shire-President – Ronald Grant, Shire president of the Cocos (Keeling) Islands (2001–2007)
 (self-governing territory of Australia)
Administrator – Tony Messner, Administrator of Norfolk Island (1997–2003)
Chief Minister – Geoffrey Robert Gardner, Chief Minister of Norfolk Island (2001–2006)

President – Ratu Josefa Iloilo, President of Fiji (2000–2006)
Prime Minister – Laisenia Qarase, Prime Minister of Fiji (2001–2006)
  (overseas territory of France)
High Commissioner – Michel Mathieu, High Commissioner of the Republic in French Polynesia (2001–2005)
Head of Government – Gaston Flosse, President of the Government of French Polynesia (1991–2004)
 (insular area of the United States)
Governor – Carl Gutierrez, Governor of Guam (1995–2003)

President – Teburoro Tito, President of Kiribati (1994–2003)

President – Kessai Note, President of the Marshall Islands (2000–2008)

President – Leo Falcam, President of Micronesia (1999–2003)

President – René Harris, President of Nauru (2001–2003)
 (sui generis collectivity of France)
High Commissioner –
Thierry Lataste, High Commissioner of New Caledonia (1999–2002)
Alain Triolle, Acting High Commissioner of New Caledonia (2002)
Daniel Constantin, High Commissioner of New Caledonia (2002–2005)
Head of Government – Pierre Frogier, President of the Government of New Caledonia (2001–2004)

Monarch – Elizabeth II, Queen of New Zealand (1952–present)
Governor-General – Dame Silvia Cartwright, Governor-General of New Zealand (2001–2006)
Prime Minister – Helen Clark, Prime Minister of New Zealand (1999–2008)
 (associated state of New Zealand)
Queen's Representative – Frederick Tutu Goodwin, Queen's Representative of the Cook Islands (2001–2013)
Prime Minister –
Terepai Maoate, Prime Minister of the Cook Islands (1999–2002)
Robert Woonton, Prime Minister of the Cook Islands (2002–2004)
 (associated state of New Zealand)
Premier –
Sani Lakatani, Premier of Niue (1999–2002)
Young Vivian, Premier of Niue (2002–2008)
Tokelau (dependent territory of New Zealand)
Administrator – Lindsay Johnstone Watt, Administrator of Tokelau (1993–2003)
Head of Government –
Kuresa Nasau, Head of Government of Tokelau (2001–2002)
Pio Tuia, Head of Government of Tokelau (2002–2003)
 (Commonwealth of the United States)
Governor –
Pedro Tenorio, Governor of the Northern Mariana Islands (1998–2002)
Juan Babauta, Governor of the Northern Mariana Islands (2002–2006)

President – Tommy Remengesau, President of Palau (2001–2009)

Monarch – Elizabeth II, Queen of Papua New Guinea (1975–present)
Governor-General – Sir Silas Atopare, Governor-General of Papua New Guinea (1997–2003)
Prime Minister –
Sir Mekere Morauta, Prime Minister of Papua New Guinea (1999–2002)
Sir Michael Somare, Prime Minister of Papua New Guinea (2002–2010)
 (Overseas Territory of the United Kingdom)
redesignated from a Dependent Territory of the United Kingdom of Great Britain and Northern Ireland on 21 May
Governor – Richard Fell, Governor of the Pitcairn Islands (2001–2006)
Mayor – Steve Christian, Mayor of the Pitcairn Islands (1999–2004)

Head of State – Malietoa Tanumafili II, O le Ao o le Malo of Samoa (1962–2007)
Prime Minister – Tuila'epa Sa'ilele Malielegaoi, Prime Minister of Samoa (1998–2021)

Monarch – Elizabeth II, Queen of the Solomon Islands (1978–present)
Governor-General – Sir John Lapli, Governor-General of the Solomon Islands (1999–2004)
Prime Minister – Sir Allan Kemakeza, Prime Minister of the Solomon Islands (2001–2006)

Monarch – Tāufaʻāhau Tupou IV, King of Tonga (1965–2006)
Prime Minister – Prince Lavaka Ata ʻUlukālala, Prime Minister of Tonga (2000–2006)

Monarch – Elizabeth II, Queen of Tuvalu (1978–present)
Governor-General – Sir Tomasi Puapua, Governor-General of Tuvalu (1998–2003)
Prime Minister –
Koloa Talake, Prime Minister of Tuvalu (2001–2002)
Saufatu Sopoanga, Prime Minister of Tuvalu (2002–2004)

President – John Bani, President of Vanuatu (1999–2004)
Prime Minister – Edward Natapei, Prime Minister of Vanuatu (2001–2004)
  (overseas territory of France)
Administrator –
Alain Waquet, Administrator Superior of Wallis and Futuna (2000–2002)
Christian Job, Administrator Superior of Wallis and Futuna (2002–2005)
Head of Government – Patalione Kanimoa, President of the Territorial Assembly of Wallis and Futuna (2001–2005)

South America

President –
Eduardo Camaño, Acting President of Argentina (2001–2002)
Eduardo Duhalde, President of Argentina (2002–2003)

President –
Jorge Quiroga, President of Bolivia (2001–2002)
Gonzalo Sánchez de Lozada, President of Bolivia (2002–2003)

President – Fernando Henrique Cardoso, President of Brazil (1995–2002)

President – Ricardo Lagos, President of Chile (2000–2006)

President –
Andrés Pastrana Arango, President of Colombia (1998–2002)
Álvaro Uribe, President of Colombia (2002–2010)

President – Gustavo Noboa, President of Ecuador (2000–2003)
 (Overseas Territory of the United Kingdom)
redesignated from a Dependent Territory of the United Kingdom of Great Britain and Northern Ireland on 21 May
Governor –
Donald Lamont, Governor of the Falkland Islands (1999–2002)
Russ Jarvis, Acting Governor of the Falkland Islands (2002)
Howard Pearce, Governor of the Falkland Islands (2002–2006)
Head of Government – Michael Blanch, Chief Executive of the Falkland Islands (2000–2003)

President – Bharrat Jagdeo, President of Guyana (1999–2011)
Prime Minister – Sam Hinds, Prime Minister of Guyana (1999–2015)

President – Luis Ángel González Macchi, President of Paraguay (1999–2003)

President – Alejandro Toledo, President of Peru (2001–2006)
Prime Minister –
Roberto Dañino, President of the Council of Ministers of Peru (2001–2002)
Luis Solari De La Fuente, President of the Council of Ministers of Peru (2002–2003)

President – Ronald Venetiaan, President of Suriname (2000–2010)

President – Jorge Batlle Ibáñez, President of Uruguay (2000–2005)

President –
Hugo Chávez, President of Venezuela (1999–2002)
Pedro Carmona, President of Venezuela (2002)
Diosdado Cabello, Acting President of Venezuela (2002)
Hugo Chávez, President of Venezuela (2002–2013)

Notes

External links
Rulersa list of rulers throughout time and places
WorldStatesmenan online encyclopedia of the leaders of nations and territories

State leaders
State leaders
State leaders
2002